Pirate Submarine is a 1951 French film that was released in the United States in 1952. It told the story of the French submarine  in World War Two.

Its original title was Casabianca. It was made in French and released in a dubbed English version.

The French Navy submarine , a sister ship of Casabianca, was used in the making of the film.

Cast
Pierre Dudan as Sgt. Tony Luccioni
Gérard Landry as Lt. Delac
Jean Vilmont as Chief Engineer Marac
Alain Terrane as 'Mistral', tall sailor
Jean Vilar as Submarine Commandant Jean L'Herminier

References

External links

1951 films
French war films
1950s French-language films
World War II submarine films
1950s war films
French black-and-white films
1950s French films